Sala Thammasop railway station is a railway station located in Sala Thammasop Subdistrict, Thawi Watthana District, Bangkok.

Although it is a minor station, Sala Thammasop offers advance ticket booking services for general passengers like other railway stations. Considered as the last station of southern railway line in the area of Bangkok.

Sala Thammasop railway station is located in Soi Sala Thammasop 26, which is surrounded by an environment similar to the countryside, despite the fact that it is located in Bangkok.

In 2011 Thailand great floods, this station was also affected.

Train services 
 Ordinary 251/252 Bang Sue Junction–Prachuap Khiri Khan–Bang Sue Junction
 Ordinary 254/255 Lang Suan–Thon Buri–Lang Suan
 Ordinary 257/258 Thon Buri–Nam Tok–Thon Buri
 Ordinary 259/260 Thon Buri–Nam Tok–Thon Buri
 Ordinary 261/262 Bangkok–Hua Hin–Bangkok
 Ordinary 351/352 Thon Buri–Ratchaburi–Thon Buri
 Commuter 355/356 Bangkok–Suphan Buri–Bangkok
 Rapid 177/178 Thon Buri–Lang Suan–Thon Buri
 Commuter 919/920 [1,2,3,4,5] Thon Buri–Salaya–Thon Buri

References 

Railway stations in Thailand